An Bình is a Ward (Vietnam) (phường) in Biên Hòa city  of Đồng Nai province, Vietnam. It has an area of about 10.4km2 and the population in 2017 was 57,700.

References

Bien Hoa